The Pulido Rivers is a watercourse in the Atacama Region that originates in the foothills of the confluence of the Vizcachas and Ramadillas rivers and one of the formative rivers of the Copiapó River.

See also
List of rivers of Chile

References
 EVALUACION DE LOS RECURSOS HIDRICOS SUPERFICIALES EN LA CUENCA DEL RIO BIO BIO

Rivers of Chile
Rivers of Atacama Region